Andreas Cellarius (–1665) was a Dutch–German cartographer and cosmographer best known for his 1660 Harmonia Macrocosmica, a major star atlas.

Life 
He was born in Neuhausen, and was educated in Heidelberg. The Protestant Cellarius may have left Heidelberg at the onset of the Thirty Years' War in 1618 or in 1622, when the city came in Catholic hands. His activities are unclear at this time but based on his later works it is conjectured that he spent time in Poland where he may have worked as a military engineer.

In 1625, he married Catharina Eltemans in Amsterdam, where he worked as school master of a Latin school. After a brief stay in The Hague, the family moved to Hoorn. From 1637 until his death, he was rector of the Latin School in Hoorn, where Pieter Anthoniszoon Overtwater was conrector.

The minor planet 12618 Cellarius is named in his honour.

External links 
 
 

17th-century Dutch cartographers
1590s births
1665 deaths
Dutch celestial cartography in the Age of Discovery
Astronomy in the Dutch Republic
German geographers
German Protestants
People from Hoorn
People from Worms, Germany